Christian Dumont (19 April 1963 – 6 August 2021) was a French biathlete. He competed at the 1988 Winter Olympics and the 1992 Winter Olympics. He died of a heart attack during a bicycle ride, aged 58.

References

External links
 

1963 births
2021 deaths
French male biathletes
Olympic biathletes of France
Biathletes at the 1988 Winter Olympics
Biathletes at the 1992 Winter Olympics
Sportspeople from Doubs